Simona Halep was the two-time defending champion, but lost to Karolína Plíšková in the quarterfinals.

Petra Kvitová won the title, defeating Kiki Bertens in the final, 7–6(8–6), 4–6, 6–3. This was Kvitová's third title in Madrid, and she became the first, and, to date, only, female player to win three titles at the Mutua Madrid Open.

Halep and Caroline Wozniacki were in contention for the WTA no. 1 singles ranking at the beginning of the tournament. Halep retained the top ranking when Wozniacki lost to Bertens in the third round.

Seeds

Draw

Finals

Top half

Section 1

Section 2

Bottom half

Section 3

Section 4

Qualifying

Seeds

Qualifiers

Draw

First qualifier

Second qualifier

Third qualifier

Fourth qualifier

Fifth qualifier

Sixth qualifier

Seventh qualifier

Eighth qualifier

References

External Links
 Main Draw
 Qualifying Draw

Women's - Singles